James Murphy (1821 – 27 December 1888) was a brewer and politician in colonial Victoria, a member of the Victorian Legislative Council.

Early life
Murphy was born in Dublin, Ireland, the son of John Murphy and his wife Mary, née Morgan.

Colonial Australia
Murphy arrived in the Port Phillip District around 1839. On 8 June 1853 Murphy was elected to the unicameral Victorian Legislative Council for the City of Melbourne. Murphy held this position until resigning in September 1855.

Murphy died in Northcote, Victoria on 27 December 1888, he was unmarried.

References

 

1821 births
1888 deaths
Members of the Victorian Legislative Council
Irish emigrants to colonial Australia
19th-century Australian politicians
Politicians from Dublin (city)
Politicians from Melbourne